Aventura Technologies Inc, is New York-based company that designs, develops and manufacturers security hardware and software products and peripheral solutions, with the US government being one of its biggest customers.

In November 2019, federal prosecutors accused Aventura of purchasing security hardware and software products from China, and fraudulently modifying them as US-manufactured before reselling to the US government, US military, and enterprises. Jack Cabasso, 61-year-old owner of Aventura, has had a criminal history since 1982 including jury tampering, grand larceny, and other crimes and he has "deep business relationships" in China. Cabasso, alongside six others, were arrested and charged with various counts, with 12 bank accounts and a yacht seized.

Aventura Technologies, Inc. was indicted on December 6, 2019 for its alleged participation in two schemes to defraud the United States, with associated charges of conspiracy to commit wire and mail fraud, unlawful importation, and money laundering.

History 
Aventura Technologies was raided by federal authorities on November 7, 2019 for allegedly selling components made by China to the United States Army, US Air Force, Marines Corps, and US Navy while claiming that the components were made in the United States. The company and its senior management were charged with fraud, money laundering and illegal importation of equipment manufactured in China.

References

Manufacturing companies based in New York (state)
Technology companies of the United States